Tracy High School is a four-year public secondary school located in Tracy, California, United States. Enrollment during the 2009-2010 school year was 2339 students.

History. 
Prior to its opening in 1917, high school students attended classes in second-floor classrooms at Tracy School on Central Avenue. Before 1912, students had to attend school in Stockton or elsewhere.

The high school, designed by W.H. Weeks in the mission style, was built on the unit system so additions could be made without changing the building's style. Costing about $65,000, the school was originally built with 14 classrooms and an auditorium with seating for about 1,000 people. In 1922 a gymnasium was added so that the school would meet California accreditation requirements.

In 2006 the voters passed Measure E, which provided the funds to completely renovate the campus. In October 2006, the old west building, built in 1917, was torn down because it was condemned by the state of California. It was replaced by a new 40-classroom building in the mission style, completed in 2008-2009. This now functions as the new main building on campus, housing the main offices in addition to two floors of classrooms

Academics 
Academic programs include the International Baccalaureate Program, the Ag-Science Academy, a Performing Arts Magnet, Child Development and Education, Food Education and Service Training (FEAST), and Industrial Technology. In 2007 the school was named a California Distinguished High School.

Popular culture
 A scene in the film The Candidate was shot in Tracy, utilizing the school's homecoming parade as the film's campaign parade for the movie's fictional senatorial candidate, played by Robert Redford. Members of Tracy High's staff, including principal and vice-principal, had cameo roles as Secret Service agents.
 The Tracy High football field and MVP trophy are named after Peter B. Kyne, a novelist from San Francisco whose Bohemian Club friends orchestrated the naming in 1927, Peter B. Kyne and his Bohemian Club friends had given the money to purchase the equipment required for early Tracy High sports.

Notable alumni
Keyshia Cole - R&B singer (attended)
Nick Eddy '62 - NFL player
Rod Lauren '57 - Singer/actor.
Christine Maddox '68 - December 1973 Playmate of the Month.
Matt Overton '03 - NFL player
Richard Pombo '79 - United States congressman
Scott Stringer '67 - NFL player
Bob Swenson  '71 -  NFL player
 Malorie Bournazian  ‘18 -  Keynote Speaker

References

External links
Official website

Magnet schools in California
High schools in San Joaquin County, California
Tracy, California
Public high schools in California
1917 establishments in California